The Association of Theological Schools in the United States and Canada (ATS) is an organization of seminaries and other graduate schools of theology. ATS has its headquarters in Pittsburgh, Pennsylvania.

History
It was founded in 1918. The association's stated mission is "to promote the improvement and enhancement of theological schools to the benefit of communities of faith and the broader public."

The ATS Commission on Accrediting provides graduate schools of theology with accreditation.  It is recognized by both the Council for Higher Education Accreditation and the United States Department of Education as an accrediting body.

Since July 2017, Frank M. Yamada became the association's executive director.

In 2020, it claimed 270 member schools.

See also
 List of schools accredited by the Commission on Accrediting of the Association of Theological Schools in the United States and Canada

References

External links
 

Religious organizations based in the United States
College and university associations and consortia in North America
School accreditors
Seminaries and theological colleges in the United States
Seminaries and theological colleges in Canada
1918 establishments in Pennsylvania